Patrick de Lacy Aherne (6 January 1901 – 30 September 1970) was an English film actor. He was the son of the architect William de Lacy Aherne, and the elder brother of the actor Brian Aherne. The family lived at Kings Norton.

He was married to actress/comedian Renée Houston, with whom he adopted two children (Teri and Trevor) and had two children (Patrick Anthony and Alan Brian). Pat Aherne was a silent screen leading man, who was reduced to playing minor supporting roles after the transition to sound (due to hearing loss). His most notable on-screen appearances after 1930, were in Green Dolphin Street, Rocketship X-M and The Court Jester. He was a champion boxer and was in the first boxing film ever made. Pat was also a motorcycle trick rider and friend of Harley and Davidson.

Following death he donated his body to science.

Selected filmography

 The Cost of Beauty (1924)
 The Ball of Fortune (1926)
 Blinkeyes (1926) – The Basher
 Thou Fool (1926) – Minor Role
 The Silver Lining (1927) – Thomas 'Tom' Hurst
 Carry On (1927) – Bob Halliday
 A Daughter in Revolt (1927) – Jackie the Climber
 Huntingtower (1927) – Capt. John Heritage
 Virginia's Husband (1928) – Bill Hemingway 
 Love's Option (1928) – John Dacre
 The Inseparables (1929) – Laurie Weston
 Auld Lang Syne (1929) – Angus McTavish
 City of Play (1929) – Richard von Rolf
 Bindle (1931)
 Come Into My Parlour (1932) – Gerry
 The Pride of the Force (1933) – Max Heinrich
 My Old Duchess (1934) – Gaston
 The Outcast (1934) – Burke
 The Return of Bulldog Drummond (1934) – Jerry Seymour
 Falling in Love (1934) – Dick Turner
 Polly's Two Fathers (1936, Short) – Fred
 The Stoker (1937) – Russell Gilham
 Q Planes (1939) - Officer (uncredited)
 Ask a Policeman (1939) - Motorist (uncredited)
 Thursday's Child (1943) - Lance Sheridan (uncredited)
 Warn That Man (1943) – Mellows
 Dead of Night (1945) - Doctor at Psychiatric Hospital (segment "The Ventriloquist's Dummy") (uncredited)
 Singapore (1947) - British Officer (uncredited)
 Green Dolphin Street (1947) – Kapua-Manga
 Forever Amber (1947) - Abram (uncredited)
 The Paradine Case (1947) - Police Sgt. Leggett (uncredited)
 If Winter Comes (1947) - Garnet (uncredited)
 A Woman's Vengeance (1948) - Warder (uncredited)
 The Challenge (1948) – Jerome Roberts
 Rocketship X-M (1950) – Reporter #1
 Rogues of Sherwood Forest (1950) - Trooper (uncredited)
 Kim (1950) - General's Aide (uncredited)
 Soldiers Three (1951) - Soldier (uncredited)
 Lorna Doone (1951) - Judge Jeffries (uncredited)
 The Day the Earth Stood Still (1951) - General at Pentagon (uncredited)
 The Son of Dr. Jekyll (1951) - Tenement Landlord (uncredited)
 Bwana Devil (1952) – Latham
 Botany Bay (1952) - Bo's'n's Mate (uncredited)
 Rogue's March (1953) – Maj. Wensley
 Titanic (1953) - Seaman (uncredited)
 The Desert Rats (1953) - English Officer (uncredited)
 The Royal African Rifles (1953) – Capt. Curtis
 Knock on Wood (1954) - Reporter (uncredited)
 The Silver Chalice (1954) - Soldier in Chase (uncredited)
 The Court Jester (1955) – Sir Pertwee
 The Man Who Knew Too Much (1956) - Handyman (uncredited)
 Witness for the Prosecution (1957) - Court Officer (uncredited) (final film role)

References

External links
 

1901 births
1970 deaths
British expatriate male actors in the United States
English expatriates in the United States
English male film actors
English male silent film actors
Male actors from Birmingham, West Midlands
People from Kings Norton
20th-century English male actors